Fly Romania was a brand of the Romanian airline Ten Airways for low-cost operations, which operated for a few months only from Bucharest-Henri Coandă, Timișoara and Tulcea.  The company slogan was It's about you.

History
The brand started operations on 15 May 2014. It competed against other European low-cost airlines including Wizz Air, Blue Air, and EasyJet. Fly Romania started with operations to nine destinations all year round with additional charter flights from Bucharest-Henri Coandă to Antalya. All flights were operated by Ten Airways.

As of 19 August 2014, Fly Romania cancelled all remaining flights for the entire summer schedule due to low customer demand. On 29 September 2014, Fly Romania filed for bankruptcy.

Fleet
The flights were operated with McDonnell Douglas MD-80 aircraft (MD-82 and MD-83), with 160 to 170 seating capacity.

Destinations
The company flew to destinations that most of them were not served by the other companies operating in Romania at the time.

References

External links

Defunct airlines of Romania
Airlines established in 2014
Airlines disestablished in 2014
2014 disestablishments in Romania
Romanian companies established in 2014